"Heads Will Roll" is a song by American indie rock band Yeah Yeah Yeahs, released as the second single from their third studio album, It's Blitz! (2009). The CD and 7-inch singles were released in the United Kingdom on June 29, 2009. The song is sung from the viewpoint of the Queen of Hearts in Lewis Carroll's Alice's Adventures in Wonderland.

A remix by Canadian DJ A-Trak appeared in the film Project X. The remix has over 166 million views on YouTube.

Composition
The song is built around a vintage sounding string riff, which was sampled from a Mellotron sound card: "Roxy SFX 2" from the Mellotron M4000D Sound Card 02.

Music video
The music video for "Heads Will Roll" was directed by Richard Ayoade. It features the band playing in a (presumably) underground venue when a dancing werewolf whose dancing is reminiscent of Michael Jackson (who died four days before the single was released) appears on stage. A light flashes halfway through the music video and the werewolf transforms. He then proceeds to chase after the audience and kills most of them. The video then ends with the band having been murdered while Karen O continues singing, her head severed from her body. The music video contains some mockery of horror in general; instead of blood, there is red glitter and confetti and Karen O keeps singing while decapitated. In the UK, there are two different versions of this video, the second replacing the violent conclusion with repeated clips from the previous section of the video, but it shows the confetti falling onto the band.

It was nominated for a MTV Video Music Award for Breakthrough Video.

Track listings

Charts

Weekly charts

Year-end charts

Certifications

Other versions
Scarlett Johansson performed this in the 2021 animated feature Sing 2 as Ash

References

External links
 Yeah Yeah Yeahs Leave Heads Rolling On The Road at Billboard.com

Songs about werewolves
2009 singles
2009 songs
American new wave songs
DGC Records singles
Interscope Records singles
Music based on Alice in Wonderland
Song recordings produced by Nick Launay
Songs written by Brian Chase
Songs written by Karen O
Songs written by Nick Zinner
Ultratop 50 Singles (Flanders) number-one singles
Yeah Yeah Yeahs songs
Halloween songs